The Skirmish of Oversø near Flensburg (now part of Germany) was a German victory of the Danish forces in the struggle for Schleswig-Holstein. The Germans forces included contingents from the Kingdom of Hanover and Duchy of Mecklenburg.

Battle
The column of the Hanoverian Lieutenant Colonel Plate arrived at Bilskov Kro north of Sankelmark lake, where it learned that a squadron of 5th Danish Dragons was still south, and that it was therefore possible to cut them off. Plate immediately placed his troops with the 1st and 2nd Squadrons behind the inn and across the road while holding the 3rd Squadron in reserve. So when the Danes arrived, they found their escape route blocked, and although they sought to escape their opponents, a Colonel, four officers and 45 dragoons were captured along with the regiment's flag.

Before all the wounded prisoners could be removed, two companies of the 2nd Hunter Corps appeared and drove the Hussars back west of Bilskov. When they saw that the road was clear, the Danes reached the hilly terrain in front of Bilskov when the disaster (Seen through Danish eyes) occurred. Although the bulk of the central Federal column had been slow to advance, its front unit (a squadron of the Mecklenburg Hussars) had reached within striking distance of the Danes and immediately went on the offensive. The attack was unsuccessful and cost the Hussars six wounded, but it forced the Danes to stop the retreat and seek refuge in the swampy terrain. Around the same time, the 3rd Hanoverian Light Infantry arrived on the scene and when another Federal infantry unit arrived, the situation was becoming desperate. This unit, the 2nd Brunswick Infantry Battalion, now took part with the Hanoverians in a bayonet charge against the hard-pressed Danes. The hunters, however, fought valiantly on until about noon 16 p.m, but with a dwindling stockpile of ammunition and a rapidly increasing darkness, they ultimately had to give up the unequal fight and surrender.

References

Bibliography
Johs. Nielsen, Treårskrigen 1848-1851 1993

External links
 Kampen ved Oversø 24. april 1848

Oversø
Oversø
Oversø
1848 in Denmark
1848 in Germany
April 1848 events